Cold Coffee Morning is the title of a studio album by American country music singer Jon Randall. It was recorded for Asylum Records but never released.

Cold Coffee Morning includes two singles: "She Don't Believe in Fairy Tales" and the title track. Although the former failed to chart, the latter peaked at #71 on the U.S. Billboard country singles charts. The album also includes two duets with Lorrie Morgan, to whom Randall was married at the time.

Track listing

"Cold Coffee Morning" (Rodney Crowell, Beth Nielsen Chapman)
"She Reminds Me of Texas"
"Reno and Me"
duet with Lorrie Morgan
"She Don't Believe in Fairy Tales"
"I Can't Drive You from My Mind"
"Knowing You're There"
duet with Lorrie Morgan
"Don't Call Me Shirley"
"Fall from Paradise"
"I Don't Go There Anymore"
"The Heartbreak Kind"
"I Can't Find an Angel"

References

External links
[ Cold Coffee Morning] at Allmusic

1998 albums
Asylum Records albums
Unreleased albums
Jon Randall albums